"The Heartbroke Kid" is the seventeenth episode of the sixteenth season of the American animated television series The Simpsons. It was written by Ian Maxtone-Graham and directed by Steven Dean Moore. It first aired on the Fox network in the United States on May 1, 2005. Albert Brooks guest stars in the episode, playing the character Tab Spangler, as well as briefly reprising Jacques from "Life on the Fast Lane".

"The Heartbroke Kid" is the 352nd episode in the program's history and was broadcast straight after the 351st episode, "Don't Fear the Roofer", on the Fox network in the United States.

Plot
Principal Skinner is looking for a company to sign a vending machine contract with Springfield Elementary, with half of the machine's profits going to the school. He looks at suggestions of a gumbo machine from the Sea Captain that seriously burned the Sea Captain's hand and a request box from Gil and rejects them, until he gets a suggestion from Lindsey Naegle. The unhealthy vending machines sponsored by hip-hop artists are installed, and most of the students use the machines (save for Lisa, who protests their extremely high sugar content and artificial additives), but Bart is seen using it the most frequently. Due to the high fat and sugar content in the snacks, the high frequency with which he eats them, and the fact that he sold off his skateboard to Groundskeeper Willie to buy snacks, after three weeks, Bart significantly gains weight and becomes obese, and during an in-show parody of the opening credits, he suffers a heart attack after slowly trying to make it home from school.

Bart sees Dr. Hibbert, who says that malted milk balls have clogged his arteries, and that a wad of Laffy Taffy is blocking his liver. He informs the family that Bart is addicted to junk food and tells Marge to put him on a diet, although the family's attendance at a milkshake festival fails to persuade him. Lisa discovers that Bart has been hiding junk food in the walls of his room, and the family stages an intervention. When Bart tries to run away, due to his widened and obese frame, he gets stuck in a fence and is caught by two representatives of a maximum security fat camp, Serenity Ranch. Bart ends up there with Apu, Rainier Wolfcastle (who was last seen fattening up for a movie), and Kent Brockman, and the camp's leader is none other than former junk food magnate Tab Spangler (who is dealing with many anger issues). However, whilst Bart is there, the family is faced with an expensive bill. To pay for the camp, the family converts their house into a youth hostel, which attracts German backpackers.

At the fat camp, Bart cheats by sneaking food that is disposed of, so Spangler takes him home to visit the family to show him the horrors that occur. His family is working continually to appease the backpackers staying in their home. The Germans humiliate the family, making Homer dance for change and forcing Marge and Lisa to clean intentional messes while pointing out America's problems one by one. He suggests Bart fight his addiction, and he does, by destroying the vending machines in school. His addiction to junk food is over, and he steals the money from the vending machines, which the family uses to pay for the bill and give the Germans "Das Boot". Homer gets revenge by beating up the Germans, and tossing them out. Spangler says that Bart still has three weeks left of non-refundable treatment, and Homer goes with Spangler (by force from the family, presumably as payback for calling Bart a "freeloading fatso"), where the episode ends with them driving in Spangler's car arguing over the cheeseburger Homer is eating.

Production
Albert Brooks guest starred in the episode as Bart's fitness instructor at fat camp in his fifth appearance on the show. It was his first appearance for almost a decade, having previously voiced characters in the episodes "The Call of the Simpsons" (1990); "Life on the Fast Lane" (1990); "Bart's Inner Child" (1993) and "You Only Move Twice" (1996). In The Simpsons Movie (2007), Brooks voiced another character, Russ Cargill.

Cultural references

 When Bart says "I raged against the machine and money poured out", he is referencing American protest band Rage Against the Machine.
 The title of the episode is a reference to the 1972 film The Heartbreak Kid.
 The song Homer sings to the Germans is "99 Luftballons" by Nena (in its original German).
 Tab's car resembles a Volvo V70.
 Homer says "they're melting" in a style reminiscent of The Wicked Witch of the West in The Wizard of Oz.
 Homer urges Bart to "Do the Bartman" to try to fight his heart attack.
 When the Simpsons family are talking about keeping the money Bart stole and using it to get rid of the German backpackers, Marge uses the phrase "... give them Das Boot." in reference to the 1981 movie Das Boot.
 Bart hides his sweets in a hole in the wall hidden behind a poster and also stands in a shower of sweets, in reference to the 1994 film The Shawshank Redemption.
 Some of the snacks in the vending machine are named after Krishna, the Dalai Lama, Lollapalooza and Screaming Yellow Zonkers.

Reception
IGN listed Albert Brooks as the top guest star on The Simpsons for voicing Tab Spangler, along with his previous voice roles.

References

External links

The Simpsons Archive 

The Simpsons (season 16) episodes
2005 American television episodes
Summer camps in television
Television episodes about obesity